Kurt Hirschhorn (May 18, 1926) - November 25, 2022 was an Austrian-born American pediatrician, medical geneticist, and cytogeneticist who identified the chromosomal defects that underlie Wolf–Hirschhorn syndrome.

Early life

Hirschhorn was born in Vienna. Fleeing anti-Semitic persecution, the family relocated to Switzerland, then to the US, briefly in New York City before settling in Pittsburgh, Pennsylvania.

Career

Hirschhorn was Professor of Pediatrics, Genetics and Genomic Sciences, and Medicine Chairman Emeritus of Pediatrics at the Icahn School of Medicine at Mount Sinai in New York City. He is a fellow of the Hastings Center, an independent bioethics research institution.

Honors and awards

In 1995, Hirschhorn received the William Allan Award in human medical genetics.

Personal life
Hirschhorn is married to Rochelle Hirschhorn, who was chief of the Division of Medical Genetics at New York University for 24 years. Their son Joel Hirschhorn is also a human geneticist.

Wolf–Hirschhorn syndrome 

Wolf–Hirschhorn syndrome (WHS), caused by a chromosomal abnormality, is characterized by typical craniofacial features in infancy consisting of "Greek warrior helmet appearance" of the nose (the broad bridge of the nose continuing to the forehead), microcephaly, high forehead with prominent glabella, ocular hypertelorism, epicanthus, highly arched eyebrows, short philtrum, downturned mouth, micrognathia, and poorly formed ears with pits/tags.

All affected individuals have prenatal-onset growth deficiency followed by postnatal growth retardation and hypotonia with muscle underdevelopment. Developmental delay and mental retardation of variable degree is present in all.

References 

 
 
 
 

1926 births

American geneticists
Medical geneticists
20th-century American Jews
Austrian emigrants to the United States
Austrian Jews
Hastings Center Fellows
21st-century American Jews
Members of the National Academy of Medicine